The Stilaro (in antiquity the Elleporus or possibly Elleporos; in Calabrian dialect Stilaru) is an Italian river, which runs through Bivongi, Pazzano and Stilo in the Province of Reggio Calabria, Calabria and, along with the river, gives its name to the Vallata dello Stilaro Allaro, the valley through which it flows. It is 59.17 km long.

Along the river there are remains of iron works, which arose with the industrialization of the area, mills and two hydroelectric plants.

In 389 BC, the Battle of the Elleporus was alongside the river.

Tributaries 

Cellia
Melodare
Pardalà
Torrente Ruggero
Torrente Folea

Cascata del Marmarico 
A significant feature of the river is the Cascata del Marmarico which, at 114 metres, is the tallest waterfall both in the region of Calabria and in the Southern Apennines. Its name, Marmarico means “slow” and “heavy”, perhaps deriving from the fact that the water seems to hang in motionless threads.

References

Drainage basins of the Ionian Sea
Vallata dello Stilaro
Rivers of the Province of Reggio Calabria
Articles containing video clips
Rivers of Italy